"Tatlong Henerasyon ng Sipag at Tiyaga" (English: "Three Generations of Hard Work and Perseverance") is the sixth episode of 2019 of the Filipino drama anthology series Magpakailanman. Written by Gina Marissa Tagasa-Gil and directed by Mark A. Reyes, it aired on GMA Network in the Philippines on February 9, 2019. The episode depicts the story of three generations of the Aguilar family, which includes Filemon Aguilar and Cynthia Villar. This was also the only episode that was not narrated by its host Mel Tiangco, however it was narrated by Cynthia Villar herself.

The episode was met with controversy due to it airing while Cynthia Villar was a candidate for the 2019 Philippine Senate election; "Tatlong Henerasyon" was broadcast three days before the official campaign period for the candidates began, taking advantage of a loophole in the banning of any media portrayals of candidates during the campaign period.

Cast

Main Cast
Glydel Mercado as Senator Cynthia Villar
Gardo Versoza as Mayor Filemon Aguilar
Lotlot de Leon as Lydia Ampaya Aguilar
Marita Zobel as Celestina Aguilar

Extended Cast
Christian Vasquez as former Senator Manuel "Manny" Villar, Jr.
Chlaui Malayao as Cynthia Villar in her childhood years.
Thea Tolentino as the young Cynthia Villar
Benjamin Alves as the young Manny Villar

Production

The episode was first reported on January 24, 2019. By February 4, the official Twitter account of Magpakailanman announced the episode, providing the basic plot but not the people it will depict. On February 6, GMA announced the episode's story, director, and writer.

Reception
On the Saturday it aired, "Tatlong Henerasyon ng Sipag at Tiyaga" received a rating of 14.1% according to Kantar Media, behind another weekend anthology program Maalaala Mo Kaya, which received 25.0% for its episode about another then-current senatorial candidate, Christopher "Bong" Go.

References

2019 Philippine television episodes